Paris Ford (born June 6, 1998) is an American football safety for the New Jersey Generals of the United States Football League (USFL). He played college football at Pittsburgh.

Early life and high school
Ford was born and grew up in Pittsburgh, Pennsylvania and originally attended Seton-La Salle Catholic High School, where he played both defensive back and wide receiver on the football team. He transferred to Steel Valley High School midway through his junior year. Ford was named Class 2A All-State and an Under Armour All-American as a senior after scoring 22 touchdowns five different ways (rushing, receiving, interception return, punt return and fumble return).

College career
Ford redshirted his true freshman season. As a redshirt freshman he played in nine games on special teams. Ford was named a starter at safety going into his redshirt sophomore season. He finished the year with 97 tackles, 2.5 tackles for loss, and three forced fumbles with 14 passes defended and three interceptions and was named first-team All-Atlantic Coast Conference. Going into his redshirt junior year, Ford was named to the Chuck Bednarik Award, Jim Thorpe Award and Bronko Nagurski Trophy watchlists, and was a preseason All-American. After playing in seven games in 2020, Ford opted out of the remainder of the season to prepare for the draft, ending the season while he led the team with 45 tackles and 3 interceptions.

Professional career
Ford returned to Pittsburgh to work out at the school's pro day on March 17, 2021, where he explained that his decision to opt out was also motivated by a desire to help his family financially.

Los Angeles Rams
Despite some analysts viewing him as having late-round talent, Ford was not selected in the 2021 NFL Draft. On May 1, 2021, Ford signed as an undrafted free agent with the Los Angeles Rams. He was waived on August 23, 2021.

New Jersey Generals
On March 10, 2022, Ford was drafted by the New Jersey Generals of the United States Football League. He was transferred to the team's practice squad on April 14, 2022, and remained on the inactive roster on April 22. He was transferred to the active roster on April 30.

References

External links
Pittsburgh Panthers bio

1998 births
Living people
Players of American football from Pittsburgh
American football safeties
Pittsburgh Panthers football players
Los Angeles Rams players
New Jersey Generals (2022) players